The 2011 Nicholls State Colonels football team represented Nicholls State University as a member of the Southland Conference during the 2011 NCAA Division I FCS football season. Led by second-year head coach Charlie Stubbs, the Colonels compiled an overall record of 1–10 with a mark of 0–7 in conference play, placing last out of six teams in the Southland. Nicholls State played home games at John L. Guidry Stadium in Thibodaux, Louisiana.

Schedule

References

Nicholls State
Nicholls Colonels football seasons
Nicholls State Colonels football